Purav Raja (born 7 December 1985) is an Indian tennis player. He specializes in doubles and competes on the ATP World Tour. He has 2 ATP world tour level titles in men's doubles. He represents India in the Davis Cup.

Personal and early life
Purav Raja grew up in Mumbai and began playing tennis when he was 7 years old. He cites indoor carpet as his preferred surface, with his favourite shot being the drop shot. Raja was educated at Millfield in Somerset.

Raja is very active in the Ananda Ashran orphanage and The Fellowship of the Physically Handicapped in Mumbai. He splits his training between Mumbai and Bromley.

Professional career

Early years
Raja turned pro in year 2005. He started with ITF tour finding negligible success in singles but continued to excel in doubles. In year 2007 he started emerging as a doubles specialist as he went on to win 4 ITF titles. He followed his success in year 2008 with four more ITF doubles titles. The same year he reached his first ATP Challenger doubles final at New Delhi Challenger 4 partnering with compatriot Rohan Gajjar. He won his first doubles ATP Challenger title at 2009 Karshi Challenger with his Australian Partner Sadik Kadir.

2010–2012
From year 2010 Raja started finding consistent success at ATP Challenger tour. In year 2010 he reached four Challenger finals and won a title at 2010 Dunlop World Challenge in Tokyo with partner Treat Conrad Huey.
In 2011 Raja reached three challenger finals winning one of it at 2011 Trofeo Paolo Corazzi. 
His performance dipped slightly in 2012. He reached only two Challenger finals and could not win a title after three successful years.

2013: Breakthrough, First ATP world tour title
In February, Raja made his Davis Cup debut against Korea. He partnered with Indian doubles legend Leander Paes and won his debut tie.

2013 proved to be breakthrough year for Raja. He played most of the season with his most successful partner Divij Sharan. The pair performed consistently and reached 5 Challenger finals winning a title at Kyoto Challenger, Japan. 
Raja and Divij found their biggest success by winning their first ATP world tour title at 2013 Claro Open in Bogota, Colombia. They defeated second-seed French-Dutch combination of Édouard Roger-Vasselin and Igor Sijsling in the finals.

They also entered qualifying draw at 2013 Wimbledon Championships and successfully qualified for main draw. They lost in first round to Nicholas Monroe and Simon Stadler. This was the first match at a Grand Slam event for both Raja and Divij.

As a result of good run Raja entered top 100 rankings for the first time in his career. He also finished year inside top 100 doubles rankings at 90.

2014
Raja's performance dipped a bit in year 2014. He could reach only two Challenger finals winning only one title. He won the title with Divij Sharan at Kyoto Challenger in Japan. His performance at ATP world tour level was also poor with his best finish as a semifinal appearance at Zagreb Indoors. As a result, his rankings fell out of top 100 and he finished year at 130.

2015
Raja started season on strong note. He reached to semifinals at Chennai Open. In February, he partnered with Fabrice Martin and made to the finals at Zagreb Indoors. This was Raja's second ATP world tour level final. They lost to second seeds Marin Draganja and Henri Kontinen in the finals.
But after strong performance at ATP world tour level Raja started to struggle with his form. He could make it to only one Challenger final in first half of the season. He made good comeback in second half. He won a title at Portorož Challenger and made it to the finals at Hua Hin Challenger. He finished the year at no. 93 ranking in doubles.

2016: Second ATP world tour title
2016 proved to be very good year for Raja. He played for most part of the year with compatriot Divij Sharan and together they reached 6 ATP Challenger finals winning 4 of it. They won titles at Manchester Trophy Challenger, Aegon Surbiton Trophy, Open Castilla y León and Pune Challenger. The pair also won their second ATP world tour title at Los Cabos Open, Mexico. They defeated pair of Jonathan Erlich and Ken Skupski in the finals.

In Grand Slams, Raja played his first ever match of French Open main draw along with Ivo Karlovic of Croatia. But they crashed out in the opening round of the men's doubles event. The duo lost 1–6, 2–6 to ninth seeded Polish-Austrian pair of Lukasz Kubot and Alexander Peya.

2017
Raja continued his good form in year 2017. He started the new season on strong note by reaching to his fourth ATP world tour final at 2017 Chennai Open with partner Divij Sharan. In an all Indian final they lost to the team of Rohan Bopanna and Jeevan Nedunchezhiyan.

He reached three Challenger finals and won all of it. He won Bordeaux Challenger with Divij. In November, he won back to back titles in two consecutive weeks at Knoxville and Champaign with Leander Paes.

This was the first year in Raja's career where he played in main draw of all four Grand Slams. He played with Divij Sharan in first three slams of the year and partnered with Leander Paes for US Open. He crashed out in opening round at Australian Open, reached third round at French Open and lost in second round at Wimbledon and US Open.

In September, Raja played his second Davis Cup match with Rohan Bopanna in world group play-offs against Canada. But they lost to pair of Daniel Nestor and Vasek Pospisil.

Raja reached his career best ranking of 52 on 17 July 2017 and finished the year with doubles ranking of 60.

2018
Raja registered his best result at Australian Open by reaching third round. His partner at the event was Leander Paes.

Raja reached four ATP Challenger finals in 2018. He won two titles at Amex-Istanbul Challenger and Wolffkran Open while finishing as runner-up at Play in Challenger and Bengaluru Open.

On ATP tour he reached only two semifinals and had first round exit at 10 events. At the lack of poor performance on ATP world tour, he finished year at ranking of 90.

ATP career finals

Doubles: 4 (2 titles, 2 runner-ups)

Challenger finals

Doubles: 44 (21–23)

Doubles performance timeline

''Updated through the 2019 Wimbledon Championships.

References

External links

1985 births
Living people
Indian male tennis players
People educated at Millfield